The Pakistan national cricket team toured Zimbabwe from 23 August to 14 September 2013. The tour consisted of two Twenty20 International matches, three One Day International matches, and two Test matches. The limited overs matches was played at the Harare Sports Club while the Test matches were split between Harare and the Queens Sports Club in Bulawayo.

The series was originally supposed to take place the previous December but was postponed as it clashed with Pakistan's tour of India after the two countries decided to resume bilateral cricketing relations.

The second Test match was originally scheduled to take place at Queens Sports Club in Bulawayo but was moved to Harare as a cost saving measure. Zimbabwe's victory in the second Test was their first against another Test nation other than Bangladesh since their victory over India in 2001.

Squads

T20I series

1st T20I

2nd T20I

ODI series

1st ODI

2nd ODI

3rd ODI

Test series

1st Test

2nd Test

Broadcasting Rights

References

External links

2013 in Pakistani cricket
2013 in Zimbabwean cricket
International cricket competitions in 2013
2013
Zimbabwean cricket seasons from 2000–01